Nailed It! is an American reality television series that premiered on March 9, 2018 on Netflix. The series is a bake-off competition in the style of reality television, where three amateur bakers compete to replicate complicated cakes and confectionery in order to win a $10,000 cash prize and a "nailed it" trophy.

Series overview

Episodes

Season 1 (2018)

Season 2 (2018)

Holiday Season 1 (2018)

Season 3 (2019)

Holiday Season 2 (2019)

Season 4 (2020)

Season 5: Double Trouble (2021)

Season 6 (2021)

Season 7: Halloween (2022)

Nailed It